The 1946 All-Ireland Senior Camogie Championship was the high point of the 1946 season in Camogie. The championship was won by Antrim, who defeated Galway by a four-point margin in the final.

Structure
With Leinster and Cork unaffiliated, there were just four entrants for the championship. Tipperary beat Kerry 3–4 to nil in Cahir. Clare beat Tipperary 2–2 to 1–1 in Nenagh and had a bye from unaffiliated Cork in the final to win the Munster championship. Galway beat Mayo 5–0 to 2–1 in the Connacht final at Coyne's field in Westport.

Clare then took and lost a six-point lead against Galway in the All Ireland semi-final with goals from Mary Mulcahy and Nora Donnelly, then led again through another two goals from Sadlier and O'Donnell before goals from Kitty Greally and Josie Melvin and a point from Rita Clinton gave Galway victory. Dublin beat Wicklow in the final of an alternative Leinster championship.

Final
Gate receipts at the final at Corrigan Park were £250.

Final stages

 Match Rules
50 minutes
Replay if scores level
Maximum of 3 substitutions

See also
 All-Ireland Senior Hurling Championship
 Wikipedia List of Camogie players
 National Camogie League
 Camogie All Stars Awards
 Ashbourne Cup

References

External links
 Camogie Association
 Historical reports of All Ireland finals
 All-Ireland Senior Camogie Championship: Roll of Honour
 Camogie on facebook
 Camogie on GAA Oral History Project

1946 in camogie
1946